The Price of Silence is a 1960 British crime film directed by Montgomery Tully and starring Gordon Jackson and June Thorburn, with Mary Clare, Maya Koumani and Terence Alexander in supporting roles.

Plot
After being released from prison, Roger Fenton (Gordon Jackson) changes his name and starts to build a new life for himself. But his past catches up with him when his ex-cellmate Slug (Sam Kydd) turns up to blackmail him and an elderly visitor is murdered in his office.

Cast
 Gordon Jackson - Roger Fenton 
 June Thorburn - Audrey Truscott 
 Maya Koumani - Maria Shipley 
 Terence Alexander -John Braine 
 Mary Clare - Mrs. West 
 Victor Brooks - Supt. Wilson 
 Joan Heal - Ethel 
 Olive Sloane - Landlady 
 Llewellyn Rees - H.G. Shipley 
 Annette Kerr - Miss Collins 
 Norman Shelley - Councilor Forbes 
 Sam Kydd - Slug
 Norman Mitchell - Landlord

References

External links

1960 films
1960 crime drama films
British crime drama films
Films directed by Montgomery Tully
1960s English-language films
1950s English-language films
1960s British films